Joseph Garvin Hunter (October 4, 1899 – September 10, 1984) was an American rugby union player who competed in the 1920 Summer Olympics. He was a member of the American rugby union team, which won the gold medal.

References

External links
Profile

1899 births
1984 deaths
American rugby union players
Rugby union players at the 1920 Summer Olympics
Olympic gold medalists for the United States in rugby
United States international rugby union players
Medalists at the 1920 Summer Olympics